Paidikalva Vijaykumar (born 20 October 1986) is an Indian cricketer who plays for Andhra Pradesh.

References

External links
 

1986 births
Living people
Indian cricketers
Andhra cricketers
Cricketers from Andhra Pradesh